Prasad Jawade is an Indian actor who mainly works in Marathi film and television. Currently, he participated in Colors Marathi's reality show Bigg Boss Marathi 4 as a contestant.

Career 
Jawade was born in Kalyan, Maharashtra. Before starting a career, he joined a theatre group in Pune. In 2006, he played his first lead role in Zee Marathi's serial Vahinisaheb. In 2010, he appeared in Zee Marathi's Maziya Priyala Preet Kalena. In 2011, he got another lead role in Zee Marathi's Arundhati. In 2013, he again bagged the lead role in Star Pravah's Laxmi v/s Saraswati.

In 2015, he appeared in Ase He Kanyadan. In 2019, he came into limelight after he played a role of B.R. Ambedkar in Ek Mahanayak – Dr. B.R. Ambedkar. Since October 2022, he participated in Bigg Boss Marathi 4.

Filmography

Films

Television

References

External links 
 

Marathi actors
Living people
Male actors in Marathi television
Male actors in Hindi television
Male actors in Marathi cinema
Bigg Boss Marathi contestants
Male actors from Pune
1988 births